Ratislav "Raša" Ðelmaš (26 January 1950 – 28 October 2021) was a Serbian rock musician, best known as a member of the bands YU Grupa and Zebra.

Musical career
Đelmaš started his career as the drummer in the band Anđeli, continuing it in bands Hendriksova Deca, Mobi Dik and Felix. In 1972, he became a member of Pop Mašina, later that year he moved to Siluete, and finally to YU Grupa. With YU Grupa he recorded the albums YU Grupa (1973), Kako to da svaki dan? (1974) and YU Grupa (1975), before leaving it and forming Zebra in 1976. With Zebra he released the album Kažu da takav je red (1979), on which he played drums and keyboards and sang. In 1982, he released the solo album Hot rok, which featured Đelmaš on drums and vocals, Bata Kostić on guitar and Laza Ristovski on keyboards. After the album release Đelmaš retired from music and dedicated himself to auto racing and his restaurant. In 1989 he returned to YU Grupa, and with the band recorded albums Tragovi (1990) and Rim 1994 (1995). At the end of the 1990s, he left YU Grupa, retiring from music. He died in Belgrade on October 28, 2021 at the age of 72.

Discography

With YU Grupa

Studio albums
YU Grupa (1973)
Kako to da svaki dan? (1974)
YU Grupa (1975)
Tragovi (1990)
Rim 1994 (1995)

Live albums
Live (2007)

Singles
"Šta će meni vatra" / "Spusti glavu" (1973)
"Drveni most" / "Živi pesak" (1974)
"Sama" / "Trka" (1975)
"Osveta" / "Oprosti ljubavi" (1976)
"3 do 6" / "Tačno u podne" (1976)

With Zebra

Studio albums
Kažu da takav je red (1979)

EPs
Telefon (1977)

Singles
"Moja mala zebra" / "Šumadinka plava" (1977)
"Ma ko si ti" / "Motor" (1978)

Solo

Studio albums
Hot rok (1982)

References 

 EX YU ROCK enciklopedija 1960-2006, Janjatović Petar;

External links 
 Ratislav "Raša" Đelmaš at Discogs
 

1950 births
2021 deaths
Serbian rock drummers
Serbian rock singers
Yugoslav rock singers
Yugoslav musicians
Musicians from Belgrade